Rose Hill, also known as Rose Hill Manor, is a historic home located near Williamsport, Washington County, Maryland, United States. It was built about 1802 and is a six-bay, two-story Flemish bond brick house with a hip roof and a "widow's walk." The interior details reflect the taste of the Adamesque Federal period.

Rose Hill was listed on the National Register of Historic Places in 1973.

References

External links
, including photo from 1974, at Maryland Historical Trust

Houses on the National Register of Historic Places in Maryland
Houses in Washington County, Maryland
1800s architecture in the United States
Federal architecture in Maryland
Houses completed in 1802
National Register of Historic Places in Washington County, Maryland